The Casamance River flows westward for the most part into the Atlantic Ocean along a path about  in length. However, only  are navigable.  The Casamance is the principal river of the Kolda, Sédhiou, and Ziguinchor Regions in the southern portion of Senegal. It is located between the Gambia River to the north and the Cacheu and Geba rivers to the south.

There is a ferry at Ziguinchor in Senegal which is one of the most important towns on the river.  Other important settlements on its banks include Goudomp, Sediou, Diattakounda, Tanae, and Kolda.

References
Much of this article is a translation from the French language Wikipedia article :fr:Casamance (fleuve).

 
Rivers of Senegal
Casamance